Casualties of Retail is an album by Enter the Haggis, released on the United for Opportunity label on October 25, 2005 (see 2005 in music).  The title comes from a line in the song "Gasoline" (track three).

Track listing
"Music Box"
"Another Round"
"Gasoline"
"Twirling Towards Freedom"
"Congress"
"Haven"
"Minstrel Boy"
"Martha Stuart"
"She Moved Through the Fair"
"Life for Love"
"To the Quick"
"Down with the Ship"

Personnel
Brian Buchanan - vocals, fiddle, acoustic guitar, banjo, mandolin
Craig Downie - highland and Deger bagpipes, vocals, tin whistle, jaw harp, harmonica
Mark Abraham - electric bass, vocals
James Campbell - drums, percussion, vocals
Trevor Lewington - vocals, electric and acoustic guitars, banjo
Congas, timbales and cowbells by Anthony Giles
Harmonica on "Another Round" by Paul Reddick

2005 albums
Enter the Haggis albums